Kālāma was an ancient Indo-Aryan tribe of north-eastern South Asia whose existence is attested during the Iron Age.

Location
The Kālāmas and their capital of Kesaputta were located on the Indo-Gangetic Plain between the river Sarayū and the Mallakas to the north, the Gaṅgā to the south, Vārāṇasī to the southwest, and the kingdom of Kosala to the west. The territory of the Kālāmas covered only the countryside around their town.

Name
The origin of the name of the Kālāmas has not yet been determined.

The name of the Kālāma capital, Kesaputta originated from the Sanskrit word , meaning "hair" or "mane."

History
The Kālāmas originated as a branch of the Keśins, who early during the Indo-Aryan migrations moved from the Indus River area to the region of Pāñcāla, where they formed one of the three branches of the Pāñcāla tribe. From the Pāñcāla area, a branch of the Keśins continued migrating to the east and founded Kesaputta, where they settled and became known as the Kālāmas.

By the time of the Buddha, the Kālāmas were a dependency of Kosala and its king Pasenadi, and the Buddha visited the Kālāmas at one point during his preaching. One of the Buddha's teachers, Āḷāra Kālāma, belonged to the Kālāma tribe, as did the Buddha's disciple Bharaṇḍu.

Pasenadi's son and successor Viḍūḍabha later annexed Kālāma into the Kosala kingdom. The Kālāmas did not request a share of the Buddha's relics after his death, possibly because they had lost their independence by then. Similarly, the Vaidehas and the Nāyikas did not appear among the list of states claiming a share because they were dependencies of the Licchavikas without their own sovereignty, and the Bhaggas who were a dependency of Vatsa also could not put forth their own claim, while the Licchavikas, the Mallakas, and the Sakyas could claim shares of the relics.

Political and social organisation

Republican institutions

Assembly
Like the other , the ruling body of the Kālāma republic was an Assembly of the  elders who held the title of s (meaning "chiefs").

Like with other , the Assembly of the Kālāmas met in a santhāgāra located in their capital.

The Council
The Assembly met rarely, and the administration of the republic was instead in the hands of the Council, which was a smaller body of the Assembly composed of councillors selected from the membership of the Assembly. The Council met more often than the Assembly.

The Consul
The consul  administered the republic with the assistance of the Assembly and Council.

Religion
Unlike the other , the Kālāmas appear to have been disinterested in  traditions such as Buddhism, which might have been an alternative reason why they did not demand a share of the relics of the Buddha. Since the Kālāmas were related to the Keśins, they might instead have been more inclined towards Brahmanism.

References

Sources

 

Ancient peoples of India
Ancient peoples of Nepal
Gaṇa saṅghas